Flaviflexus equikiangi is a Gram-positive, non-spore-forming and cocci-shaped bacterium from the genus of Flaviflexus which has been isolated from the feces of a Kiang.

References

Actinomycetales
Bacteria described in 2022